Kalmar Castle is a castle in the city Kalmar in the province of Småland in Sweden.

History 

During the twelfth century a round defensive tower was built on Kalmarsund and a harbour constructed. At the end of the thirteenth century King Magnus Ladulås had a new fortress built with a curtain wall, round corner towers and two square gatehouses surrounding the original tower. Located near the site of Kalmar's medieval harbor, it has played a crucial part in Swedish history since its initial construction as a fortified tower in the 12th century.

One of the most significant political events in Scandinavia took place at Kalmar Castle in 1397, where the Kalmar Union was formed - a union of Denmark, Norway and Sweden (including Finland), organized by Queen Margaret I of Denmark. During the Swedish rebellion against Denmark in 1520, the fortress was commanded by Anna Eriksdotter (Bielke), who at the death of her spouse, Johan Månsson Natt och Dag, in the middle of the rebellion against Denmark in 1520, took control over his fiefs and defended Kalmar against Denmark.

The fortress was improved during the 16th century under the direction of King Gustav I and his sons King Eric XIV and King John III, who turned the medieval fortress into a castle fit for a renaissance king.

The garrison was loyal to King Sigismund during the rebellion by Duke Charles, and continued to hold out even after Sigismund was decisively defeated at the Battle of Stångebro. The castle was therefore besieged by the duke's forces in March 1599, and was compelled to surrender on 12 May. The three commanders were subsequently killed, along with nineteen other members of the garrison, in a mass execution traditionally known as the Second Kalmar Bloodbath.

Kalmar Castle suffered heavy damage during the Siege of Kalmar, the main engagement and namesake of the Kalmar War (1611-3), and was badly damaged by a fire in 1642. Repairs were begun, but from the end of the seventeenth century the castle was allowed to fall into disrepair.

Restoration
In 1856, architect Fredrik Wilhelm Scholander (1816–1881) initiated reconstruction/restoration work at Kalmar Castle. His pupil Helgo Zettervall continued restoring Kalmar Castle in the 1880s. Architect Carl Möller drew up the plans and other documents. The work began in 1885 and by 1891 the castle had gained the silhouette it bears today. In 1919 professor Martin Olsson was charged with the continuing restoration of earthworks, the moat, the bridge and the drawbridge. Work continued until 1941, when the castle was once more surrounded by water. Today, it is one of Sweden's best preserved renaissance castles and is open to the public.

References

Other sources
Kaufmann, J.E. Kaufmann & H.W. The Medieval Fortress: Castles, Forts and Walled Cities of the Middle Ages (MA: Da Capo Press, 2004)

Gallery

External links

Official visitor site (sv)
Barometern Multimedia Tour of Kalmar Castle
Virtual tour of the Castle
The Association of Castles and Museums around the Baltic Sea

Castles in Kalmar County
Crown palaces in Sweden
Museums in Kalmar County
Historic house museums in Sweden
Royal residences in Sweden